The Come On is a 1956 American film noir directed by Russell Birdwell, starring Anne Baxter and Sterling Hayden.

Plot
While fishing on a Mexican beach  Dave Arnold (Hayden) meets beautiful Rita Kendrick (Baxter) and they are immediately drawn to each other. Rita begs Arnold to murder her abusing husband but he refuses. Upon learning that he has been cuckolded, Harley Kendrick (Hoyt) fakes his own death in the hopes of framing Rita for the murder. A sleazy detective (White) clears Rita's name officially, but then he begins blackmailing her with the affair she has been having. She stops that game by murdering him. Later she is shocked to discover that her husband is still alive. Finally, the love triangle meets upon the beach where Rita shoots her husband. As he dies he shoots her back. Rita dies in Dave's arms.

Cast
 Anne Baxter as Rita Kendrick
 Sterling Hayden as Dave Arnold 
 John Hoyt as Harley Kendrick 
 Jesse White as J. J. McGonigle 
 Wally Cassell as Tony Margoli 
 Paul Picerni as Assistant D.A. Jannings 
 Theodore Newton as Capt. Getz 
 Tyler McVey as Detective Hogan

See also
List of American films of 1956

References

External links
 
 
 
 

1956 films
1956 crime films
American crime films
American black-and-white films
Film noir
Films scored by Paul Dunlap
1950s English-language films
1950s American films